Carlo Steven Krakoff (November 7, 1974 – July 31, 2011), professionally known as Carl Steven, was an American child actor. He was best known for his roles in Out of This World and Weird Science. He played as a young Spock in Star Trek III: The Search for Spock (1984). He voiced Fred Jones in A Pup Named Scooby-Doo.

Early life
Steven was the middle of three boys born to Glenn and Cynthia Krakoff and was a native of Glendale, California in Los Angeles County.

Career
As a boy, he appeared in a number of television series and films, with recurring roles on Webster, Punky Brewster, Out of This World, and Weird Science.

Steven also appeared in Star Trek III: The Search for Spock (1984) as a young Spock (the first actor other than Leonard Nimoy to play the role in a live action portrayal), and in a minor role in Disney's Honey, I Shrunk the Kids (1989). He provided the voice of a young Fred Jones for four seasons on the Hanna-Barbera animated series A Pup Named Scooby-Doo, Steven became the first actor besides Frank Welker to do so.

His final acting credit was in the television series Weird Science, where he played a character named Matthew. He would appear in six episodes of the series until 1996 when he retired from acting.

Personal life
Steven became addicted to prescription medications after a tonsillectomy, and stole to support his addiction. He married Dawn Krakoff in 1998; they remained married until his death in 2011. He had a son named Noah.

Legal issues
In 2009, Steven was arrested for committing six armed robberies at several Walgreens stores and CVS Pharmacy stores. He was sentenced to 13 years in prison in 2010. He was scheduled to be released in 2023.

Death
Steven died on July 31, 2011, at the age of 36, of a heroin overdose while in prison in Tucson, Arizona.

Filmography

Film

Television

References

External links

1974 births
2011 deaths
American male child actors
American male film actors
American male television actors
American male voice actors
Male actors from Glendale, California
American people who died in prison custody
Deaths by heroin overdose in the United States
20th-century American male actors
American people convicted of robbery
Prisoners who died in Arizona detention